John C. Hunterson (August 4, 1841 – November 6, 1927) was a Medal of Honor recipient in the American Civil War.

He mustered in with Company B of the 3rd Pennsylvania Cavalry as a Private on July 23, 1861. He mustered out with his company, August 24, 1864.

Citation
Place and date: On the Peninsula, Va., 5 June 1862. Entered service at: Philadelphia, Pa. Birth: Philadelphia, Pa. Date of issue: 2 August 1897. Citation: While under fire, between the lines of the 2 armies, voluntarily gave up his own horse to an engineer officer whom he was accompanying on a reconnaissance and whose horse had been killed, thus enabling the officer to escape with valuable papers in his possession.

See also

List of Medal of Honor recipients

References

Further reading
"An Incident of Orderly Duty on the Peninsula, June 5, 1862", History of the Third Pennsylvania Cavalry, Sixtieth Regiment Pennsylvania Volunteers, in the American Civil War, 1861–1865. By Pennsylvania Cavalry. 3d Regt., 1861–1865, Capt. William Brooke Rawle. Published by Franklin Printing Company, 1905. pp. 519–522.
"At the Risk of His Life", Deeds of Valor: How American Heroes Won the Medal of Honor; History of Our Country's Recent Wars in Personal Reminiscences and Records of Officers and Enlisted Men who Were Rewarded by Congress for Most Conspicuous Acts of Bravery on the Battle-field, on the High Seas and in Arctic Explorations ..., by Walter Frederick Beyer, Oscar Frederick Keydel. Published by the Perrien-Keydel Co., 1907, p. 43.

External links

United States Army Medal of Honor recipients
United States Army soldiers
Union Army soldiers
1841 births
1927 deaths
American Civil War recipients of the Medal of Honor
Military personnel from Philadelphia
Burials at Gloria Dei (Old Swedes') Church